Quelentaro, previously Conjunto Quelentaro, was a Chilean folk music group founded in 1960 by brothers Eduardo and Gastón Guzmán. Original members also included José Leppe, Valericio Leppe, Eladio López and Arinaldo Álvarez.

Discography
 Carpa de La Reina (1966, EMI Odeón)
 Coplas al viento (1967, EMI Odeón)
 Huella campesina (1968, EMI Odeón)
 Leña gruesa (1969, EMI Odeón)
 Coplas libertarias a la historia de Chile, Vol.1 (1969, EMI Odeón)
 Judas (1970, EMI Odeón)
 Cesante (1972, EMI Odeón)
 Coplas libertarias a la historia de Chile, Vol. 2 (1972, EMI Odeón)
 Quiebracanto, tiempo de amor (1975)
 Tiempo de amor (1976, EMI Odeón)
 Qué de caminos (1977, EMI Odeón)
 Buscando siembra (1979, EMI Odeón)
 Lonconao (1982)
 Reverdeciendo (1983)
 Aquiebracanto (1985)
 En Vivo (released 1988, recorded in 1985, live at the Teatro Gran Palace)
 Después de la tormenta (1989)
 8 de marzo (1996)
 8 de marzo, volumen 2 (2002)
 Por siempre (released 2005, recorded live in 2003)
 Coplas libertarias a la historia de Chile, Vol. 1 y 2 (new versions) (2007)
 Coplas libertarias a la historia de Chile, Vol. 3 y 4 (2011)
 Copla del hijo (2013)

External links
 Quelentaro por dentro (2004, Editorial Universidad de Los Lagos, Osorno), de Antolin Guzmán Valenzuela

See also
 Quelentaro on Spanish Wikipedia

References

1960 establishments in Chile
2019 disestablishments in Chile
Chilean musicians
Musical groups established in 1960
Musical groups disestablished in 2019